Elizabeth Walker (1800–1876) was a British engraver and portrait-painter.

She was born Elizabeth Reynolds in London, daughter of engraver Samuel William Reynolds. In 1829, she married Scottish engraver William Walker (1791–1867). She studied engraving under Thomas Goff Lupton, but after a while, decided to devote herself to miniatures (studying under George Clint) rather than engraving. She exhibited at the Royal Academy 1818–50, was appointed miniature painter to William IV in 1830, and executed portraits of five Prime Ministers. Walker died in London on 9 November 1876.

Gallery

References

External links
 Includes images of 10 of her works

1800 births
1876 deaths
19th-century British women artists
19th-century British painters
British engravers
British portrait painters
British women painters
Painters from London
Women engravers